Al-Zuq al-Fawqani was a Palestinian Arab village in the Safad Subdistrict. It was depopulated during the 1948 Arab-Israeli War on May 21, 1948, by the Palmach's First Battalion of Operation Yiftach. It was located 32 km northeast of Safad.

History
Archeological excavations has showed that Al-Zuq al-Fawqani was populated in the late  Mamluk era.

Ottoman era
Archeological excavations  showed that a large hall, with several courtyards was constructed, probably a  Khan. Damages indicate that it was destroyed in an earthquake. Pottery from Rashaya el-Fukhar was also found.

In 1875, Victor Guérin  noted a large ruined village called Kharbet Khan ez-Zouk el-Fôkani. It was bordered in the west by  Wadi Derdara, which was crossed on a small bridge, and had a water mill. There were  many destroyed houses everywhere: they had been built with calcareous or basaltic stones, of different sizes and more or less well cut. Cisterns and presses attested an ancient origin.

In 1881, the PEF's Survey of Western Palestine noted at Kh. Zuk el Haj "Foundations of walls buit with basaltic masonry."

British Mandate era
In the 1945 statistics   it had a population of 160,  with a total of 1,832  dunams of land, according to an official land and population survey.   Of this,  503   dunums  were for used for plantations and irrigable land, 1,286 were used for  cereals; while a total  of 43  dunams were classified as uncultivable.

1948, and aftermath
Al-Zuq al-Fawqani first became depopulated on May 21, 1948, after a whispering campaign.   In late May, many villagers returned, mainly to harvest the crops. The Haganah then started to systematically burn the villages in the area. 

In 1992 the village site was described: "The stones of destroyed homes are strewn across the site, which is overgrown with grass, thorns, and a few cactus plants. The nearby settlement of Yuval cultivates part of the surrounding land, and uses the rest as forests and grazing grounds."

References

Bibliography

External links
Welcome To al-Zuq al-Fawqani
al-Zuq al-Fawqani, Zochrot
Survey of Western Palestine, Map 2:   IAA, Wikimedia commons
al-Zuq al-Fawqani, from the Khalil Sakakini Cultural Center
al-Zuq al-Fawqani, Dr. Khalil Rizk.

Arab villages depopulated during the 1948 Arab–Israeli War
District of Safad